The second wave of Walt Disney Treasures was released December 3, 2002. This was the final wave with the tin's individual number embossed on the tin.

Mickey Mouse in Black and White

This set displays a variety of Mickey Mouse cartoon shorts released in black and white.

125,000 sets produced.

Disc one
1928
Steamboat Willie
The Gallopin' Gaucho
Plane Crazy

1929
The Karnival Kid
Mickey's Follies

1930
The Fire Fighters
The Chain Gang
The Gorilla Mystery
Pioneer Days

1931
The Birthday Party
Mickey Steps Out
Blue Rhythm
Mickey Cuts Up
Mickey's Orphans

1932
The Duck Hunt
Mickey's Revue
Mickey's Nightmare
The Whoopee Party
Touchdown Mickey
The Klondike Kid
Bonus Features
Frank and Ollie... and Mickey: An interview between Maltin and two of the most legendary Disney artists of all time, Frank Thomas and Ollie Johnston. Even though they joined the Disney team towards the end of Mickey's days in black and white, they have a lot to say about what the character meant to them, both before and during their days with Disney.
Two Story Scripts: These scripts first provide a look at a complete panel and then a close-up of the text and the picture on each panel. The two scripts are for "Steamboat Willie" and "Mickey Steps Out".
Story Sketches: Various story sketch sequences from some of the cartoons presented on this disc.
The Mickey Mouse Club: Easter egg bonus involving the Mickey Mouse Club, not the more familiar TV show of the 1950s, but an actual club popping up across the nation in 1930's. This supplement takes viewers inside those club meetings via a newsreel profiling them during the era. There's also a short that was created by Disney exclusively for these clubs: a sing-along to "Minnie's Yoo Hoo" with Mickey Mouse, complete with a second verse.

Disc two
1933
Building a Building
The Mad Doctor
Ye Olden Days
The Mail Pilot
Mickey's Gala Premier
Puppy Love
The Pet Store
Giantland

1934
Camping Out
Gulliver Mickey
Orphan's Benefit
The Dognapper
Two-Gun Mickey

1935
Mickey's Service Station
Bonus Features
Pencil Test From The Mail Pilot: The cartoon short played in the preliminary pencil phase.
Story Sketches: More story sketch sequences from some of the cartoons presented on this disc.
Poster Gallery: A variety of posters of many of the cartoons presented on this set.

The Complete Goofy

This set provides a look at all of the cartoons involving the career of Goofy except for How to Ride a Horse (1941) (a segment from The Reluctant Dragon) (although the original theatrical poster is included in the Disc 2 gallery), El Gaucho Goofy (1943) (a segment from the package film Saludos Amigos), Freewayphobia #1 (1965), Goofy's Freeway Trouble (1965), Sport Goofy in Soccermania (TV special) (1987) and How to Hook Up Your Home Theater (2007) being made and released after the initial DVDs set came out.

The "Donald & Goofy" shorts Polar Trappers (1938), The Fox Hunt (1938), Billposters (1940), No Sail (1945), Frank Duck Brings 'em Back Alive (1946), and Crazy with the Heat (1947) are instead included on The Chronological Donald, Volume 1, Volume 2 and Volume 3, respectively, because they have always been put under Donald Duck's filmography, not Goofy's.

In addition to the commentary provided by Leonard Maltin for some of the galleries on Disc 2, Goofy himself (voiced by Bill Farmer) provides some comments on others.

125,000 sets produced.

Disc one
1939
Goofy and Wilbur
1940
Goofy's Glider
1941
Baggage Buster
The Art of Skiing
The Art of Self Defense
1942
How to Play Baseball
The Olympic Champ
How to Swim
How to Fish
1943
Victory Vehicles
1944
How to Be a Sailor
How to Play Golf
How to Play Football
1945
Tiger Trouble
African Diary
Californy'er Bust
Hockey Homicide
1946
A Knight For a Day
Double Dribble
1947
Foul Hunting
1948
They're Off
The Big Wash
Bonus Features
The Essential Goof: Using a montage of clips from the various Goofy shorts on this set, the analysis of the character, as spoken by the one who originally drew him, Art Babbitt (who also created the Big Bad Wolf and the balletic mushrooms in Fantasia) is repeated here. You can view the entire analysis on the article on Goofy by clicking here. Incidentally, Art's narration is actually spoken by Earl Boen.
The Man Behind the Goof: A mini-biography about the original voice of Goofy, Pinto Colvig. This biography reveals that in his youth, Colvig loved to travel with the circus, where he'd perform as a clown. He spent much of his life at Disney where in addition to voicing Goofy, he'd also voiced Pluto, the Practical Pig, the Grasshopper in The Grasshopper and the Ants (where Colvig, as the grasshopper, sang "The World Owes Me a Livin'", which he'd later add to Goofy) and two of the Seven Dwarfs (specifically, Grumpy and Sleepy). He also left Disney temporarily to voice Gabby at Max Fleischer's studios, but later returned to Disney where he'd spend the rest of his life voicing Goofy. He also was the original Bozo the Clown for Capitol Records on records, radio and television.

Disc two

1949
Tennis Racquet
Goofy Gymnastics
1950
Motor Mania
Hold That Pose
1951
Lion Down
Home Made Home
Cold War
Tomorrow We Diet
Get Rich Quick
Fathers Are People
No Smoking
1952
Father's Lion
Hello Aloha
Man's Best Friend
Two-Gun Goofy
Teachers Are People
Two Weeks Vacation
How to Be a Detective
1953
Father's Day Off
For Whom the Bulls Toil
Father's Week End
How to Dance
How to Sleep
1961
Aquamania
Bonus Features
A Conversation With Goofy's Voice: Bill Farmer: As the title implies, Maltin interviews the present voice of Goofy, Bill Farmer, who had been voicing Goofy since 1986. Farmer reveals his origins and how he came to voice Goofy. It is revealed that Farmer had voiced Goofy in more than 3000 different Disney projects, not only cartoons, but also albums, telephones, commercials and many others.
Poster Gallery: Many of the posters of the Goofy shorts are presented here. Curiously, Maltin does not provide commentary as he usually does on the sets; instead, it's Goofy who provides the occasional comment/exclamation.
Memorabilia Gallery: This gallery shows off various Goofy memorabilia, such as books and albums. Maltin does do the commentary here.
Goofy Through the Years Gallery: This gallery reveals storyboard sketches, animation drawings and background paintings of many of the Goofy shorts presented. Again, Maltin does not provide commentary; once again, it's Goofy.

Behind the Scenes at the Walt Disney Studio

This set provides a history of the Walt Disney Studios and of animation from the days of the caveman to the present. Along with a tour of the studios, some Disney animators are introduced and the process of producing films at Disney is covered.
Most of the contents are from Walt Disney anthology series.

125,000 sets produced.

Disc one
A Trip Through the Walt Disney Studios (1937): This short film, made by Disney at the request of then-distributor RKO Radio Pictures, explores the promotion of Snow White and the Seven Dwarfs. It offers a look at the film as well as a behind-the-scenes visit to the Disney Studio for an introduction to the artists and animators and their process. This film first appeared in 2001 on the 2-disc Snow White Platinum Edition DVD set.
How Walt Disney Cartoons Are Made (1938): This promotional film, which also first appeared on the Snow White Platinum Edition DVD set in 2001, is a more family-friendly version of A Trip Through the Walt Disney Studios.
The Reluctant Dragon (1941): This film features actor and humorist Robert Benchley wandering through the new and improved Disney Studios in Burbank to try to find Walt, in hopes of selling him on the idea of making a film of Kenneth Grahame's book, The Reluctant Dragon. He explores an art class, dialogue and sound effects stages, the multiplane camera department, the paint department and, finally, the story and animation departments until finally he discovers Disney has already finished the cartoon version of the story.
Bonus Features
Leonard Maltin's Studio Tour: Maltin provides a history of the studio, from the days of the Alice Comedies to the present day.
Behind the Boards on Baby Weems: An interview with longtime Disney story man and artist Joe Grant. Maltin discusses how Grant got his start at the studio and the unusual story-reel format of the "Baby Weems" short seen in The Reluctant Dragon. Grant reveals that "Weems" and the "Dragon" shorts from the film were both originally considered for full-length theatrical releases, but ultimately didn't warrant the longer running time.
The Reluctant Dragon Gallery: Promotional black-and-white stills of the film and its actors.Studio Gallery: Photos of the old Hyperion lot.

Disc twoThe Story of the Animated Drawing: On this 1955 episode of the Disney anthology series, Walt serves as the delightful host as he discusses the history of animation from the days of the caveman to the days of some primitive mechanical animation contraptions in the 1800s that were used to experiment with the art form. Then it moves on to more advance types of animation experiments, such as in J. Stuart Blackton's Humorous Phases of Funny Faces, Winsor McCay's Gertie the Dinosaur and even a demonstration of how music was synchronized into cartoons in the early days of the cinema.
The Plausible Impossible: On this 1956 episode of the anthology series, Walt explains how his animators make the impossible seem realistic through various cartoons with Mickey and Donald. This episode also includes a pencil-test form of one scene from Snow White that was ultimately not used in the final film.
Tricks of our Trade: On this 1957 episode of the anthology series, Walt dwells on how animators study real life to create their illustrations. Examples are given from Fantasia on following a live ballerina to draw the animals' movements in Dance of the Hours, and copying actual bubbles to produce the boiling lava in The Rite of Spring. The groundbreaking multiplane camera is shown off, demonstrating how it is used to mimic real landscapes, since plain animated backgrounds seem to be too plain and create a false effect.
Bonus Features
Kem Weber Gallery: This gallery has architectural concept art for the Burbank lot.
Tour of the Disney Studio: This is a rare half-hour radio broadcast from Australia in 1946, in which studio personnel Homer Brightman, Harry Reeves, Eric Larson and Walt himself offer general information on the making of the animated films at the time.

2